The Coaching Club (casually The Coaching Club of New York, New York Coaching Club, or Coaching Club of America) was formed in New York City in 1875 to encourage four-in-hand driving in America.  It was intended to attract members from all parts of the United States.

Initiated by Colonels DeLancey Kane and William Jay, the club had its first official meeting at the Knickerbocker Club on Fifth Avenue on December 3, 1875.  The Knickerbocker Club became its headquarters. Later some activities were moved nearer Central Park to the Metropolitan Club, nine members of which were founders of the Coaching Club. 

The Coaching Club's annual parade was replaced about 1917 by Belmont Park's Coaching Club American Oaks, a race for three-year-old fillies.

Activities
There were regular events, dinners and annual parades through Central Park.

Membership
Qualification for membership: "the ability to drive four horses with grace and skill". Driving four-in-hand requires the coachman to hold the reins of all four horses in one fist. 

Coaching was a very expensive pursuit and membership, at first restricted to fifty then thirty people at any one time, was limited to those owners and drivers of coaches drawn by four horses that had no involvement in racing, hunting or polo. It became difficult to keep a full membership and from 1925 members were allowed those associations.

Pioneer
The club owned its own coach, Pioneer. The general public could buy seats in members' coaches and be driven about by the club members. When it was pointed out the result was New York's aristocracy carried common citizens members responded that some of the English aristocracy had driven scheduled public services for some time.

Tally-ho
One of the original Coaching Club coaches belonging to Kane was called Tally-ho. It became so well known any coach-and-four was called a tally-ho by the general public. Kane's Tally-ho was donated to the Museum of the City of New York in 1933 and now may be seen at the Long Island Museum of American Art, History, and Carriages in Stony Brook, N.Y.

Reginald W Rives "The Coaching Club, its History, Records and Activities" privately printed 1935

Similar clubs in America
Ladies Four-in-Hand Driving Club
Four-in-hand Club of Philadelphia
Stamford Coaching Club
World Coaching Club

See also
World Four-in-Hand Championships
Four-In-Hand Driving Club
Driving club
The Fairman Rogers Four-in-Hand
Quadriga

Reference
Online copies of The Carriage Journal published by The Carriage Association of America, accessed May 22nd, 2018

External links
Coaching Club uniform New York Historical Society.

Horses in the United States
Outdoor recreation in the United States
Upper class culture in New York City
Equestrian sports in the United States
1875 establishments in New York (state)
Recurring events established in 1875